The Torneo Tenis Playa, also named as Trofeo Juan Avendaño is an exhibition tennis tournament played annually in La Ribera beach in Luanco, Asturias, Spain.

It is the only tennis tournament in the world organized over the sand of a beach, during the low tide of the sea. On the beach, are installed stands for 2,000 seats.

History
The first tournament was played in 1971, by initiative of a group of friends who didn't have any court to play in the town. In 1973, Juan Avendaño played his first tournament and since that year, it grows in popularity. In 1995, the tournament is re-organized thank to Avendaño and professional players start to play it.

The tournament is played between July and August, when the low tide comes in the night. In 2006, the Torneo Tenis Playa is declared as tourist interest activity and it is broadcast on TV by Asturian TPA.

In 2014, the board of the Torneo Tenis Playa did not reach any agreement for the organization of the tournament and it was not played. This agreement arrived in January 2015, and it was announced the tournament would be recovered for July 2015, but ultimately the tournament did not take place.

After a stint of seven years without being played, the tournament would come back in 2020. However, due to the COVID-19 pandemic it was postponed for one more year.

Tournament winners

Previous editions

2009
Due to heavy rain, the final was played with a format of only one set where the winner was the first one to achieve ten games.

2010

2011

Source

2012

2013
Source

2022
Source

References

External links
Official website 

Tennis tournaments in Spain
Sport in Asturias
Exhibition tennis tournaments